URTEL is an acronym for Union des Radios et Televisions Libres du Mali, the agency responsible for regulating television and radio transmission operations in Mali.

Operations
URKEL is affiliated with the following NGOs, which together form the Comité d’Appui à la Radio pour le Développement, or "CARD".

ACDI
Africare
Fondation Fredrich Ebert
Helen Keller International
Institut Panos
Plan International
PNUD
Population Médias Center
Population Services International
SNV Netherlands Development Organisation
UNESCO
Unicef Mali
USAID Mali

See also
Communications in Mali

References

 Peter Coles, Turn your radio on. New Scientist, 7 October 1995.
 Mali (2007): Freedom House report.
 Six radio station staff freed on completing sentences: Mali.  Reporters Without Borders, 26 September 2006.
 Silicon Mali. Silvia Sansoni, Forbes 02.04.02.
 VOA Training African Affiliates: Broadcasters’ Fiscal Health Key ‘To Guarantee Pluralism’.  Voice of America, 13 September 2005
 Mali Market Information Study FOOD SECURITY II COOPERATIVE AGREEMENT between U.S. AGENCY FOR INTERNATIONAL DEVELOPMENT and MICHIGAN STATE UNIVERSITY: IN-COUNTRY TIME PERIOD: JULY 1987 - DECEMBER 1994.  statistical evidence is consistent with anecdotal reports from both farmers and traders that the SIM radio broadcasts have fundamentally changed bargaining relationships between traders and farmers, forcing traders to offer more competitive prices in isolated rural markets.
 Cécile Leguy.  Revitalizing the Oral Tradition: Stories Broadcast by Radio Parana (San, Mali). Research in African Literatures, Fall 2007, Vol. 38, No. 3, Pages 136-147.
Radio Bamakan - Mali. InteRadio, Vol. 5, No.2, June 1993.

External links
URTEL  

Mass media in Mali
Regulation in Mali
Organisations based in Mali
Communications authorities